Chris Harris (born 11 November 1977 in Ebbw Vale) is a former professional Welsh darts player, currently playing in British Darts Organisation events. He qualified for the 2018 BDO World Darts Championship.

Career
In 2017, Harris reached the Last 144 of the World Masters. He qualified for the 2018 BDO World Darts Championship as one of the Playoff Qualifiers, he played Ümit Uygunsözlü in the preliminary round, winning 3–2. He will play Dean Reynolds in the first round

World Championship results

BDO
 2018: 1st Round (lost to Dean Reynolds 1-3) (sets)

References

External links
 Chris Harris' profile and stats on Darts Database

Living people
Welsh darts players
British Darts Organisation players
1977 births